The following outline is provided as an overview of and topical guide to Haryana.

Haryana – one of the 28 states of the democratic Republic of India. Located in northern region of the Indian subcontinent, it is India's 21st largest state by area, and 18th most populous state. Haryana surrounds the National Capital Territory of Delhi on three sides, forming the latter's northern, western and southern borders. The economic, social and cultural facets of Haryana include high economic development, high GDP per capita, high life expectancy, low female-to-male sex ratio, and rich sporting tradition.

General reference

Names 
 Common name: Haryana
 Pronunciation: 
 Official name: State of Haryana
 Adjectival(s): Haryanavi
 Etymology and Meaning of the Name: from the Sanskrit words Hari (a name of Vishnu) and ayana (home), meaning "the Abode of God".
 ISO subdivision code:  IN-HR

Rankings (amongst India's states) 
Out of total 29 states and union territories (1st highest, 35th lowest):
 by area (higher rank is bigger): 21st (2011 census)
 by population (higher rank is bigger): 18th
 by gross domestic product (GDP) (higher rank is better) : 13th (2014)
 by per capita income (higher rank is better): 6th 
 by unemployment rate (lower is better): 20th (47 per 1000)
 by house ownership (higher rank is better): 14th (88.4%)
 by Human Development Index (HDI) (higher rank is better): 9th
 by life expectancy at birth (higher rank is better): 12th
 by vaccination coverage (higher rank is better): 8th (74.8%)
 by low-BMI underweight people: (lower rank is better): male 12th (24.8%), female 15th (25.8%)
 by literacy rate (higher rank is better): 22nd
 by sex ratio (higher rank is better): 30th
 by cognizable crime rate (lower rank is better): 4th (2015)
 by suicide rate (lower rank is better): 15th (10.9 annual suicide per lakh of population)

Geography of Haryana 

 Haryana is: an Indian state
 Area of Haryana: 44,212 km², or 1.34% of India's total geographical area
 Population of Haryana: 25,353,081, or 2.09% of India's population (2011 Census of India)

Location of Haryana 

 Haryana is situated within the following regions:
 Northern Hemisphere
 Eastern Hemisphere
 Eurasia
 Asia
 South Asia
 Indian Subcontinent
 India
 North India
 Punjab region
 Time zone: Indian Standard Time (UTC+05:30)
 Neighboring States and UTs – Haryana is located next to:
 Chandigarh
 Delhi
 Himachal Pradesh
 Punjab
 Rajasthan
 Uttarakhand
 Uttar Pradesh

Geographic features of Haryana 
 Topographic features of Haryana
 Major Physiographic Divisions of Haryana
 Shivalik Hills to the north east
 Punjab Plain in the west
 Ghaggar-Yamuna Plain in the east, forming the largest part of the state
 Bagar region sandy plains are on the edge of Thar Desert in the south west
 Aravalli Range in the south
 Landforms of Haryana
 Dhosi Hill, an extinct volcano
 Topographic extremes of Haryana
 High: Karoh Peak, Morni Hills 
 Hydrographic features of Haryana

Environment of Haryana 
 Biogeographic realm: Indomalayan
 Biomes: Tropical and subtropical moist broadleaf forests, Tropical and subtropical dry broadleaf forests, and Deserts and xeric shrublands
 Ecoregions: Upper Gangetic Plains moist deciduous forests, Khathiar-Gir dry deciduous forests, Northwestern thorn scrub forests, and Thar desert

Wildlife of Haryana 
 Fauna of Haryana
 Flora of Haryana

Protected areas of Haryana 
 National Parks of Haryana
 Kalesar National Park
 Sultanpur National Park
 Wildlife Sanctuaries of Haryana
 Abubshahar Wildlife Sanctuary
 Bhindawas Wildlife Sanctuary
 Bir Shikargah Wildlife Sanctuary
 Chhilchhila Wildlife Sanctuary
 Khaparwas Wildlife Sanctuary
 Khol Hi-Raitan Wildlife Sanctuary
 Nahar Wildlife Sanctuary
 Saraswati Wildlife Sanctuary
 Endangered Wildlife Breeding Reserves
 Chinkara Breeding Centre Kairu, Bhiwani
 Crocodile Breeding Centre, Kurukshetra 
 Vulture Conservation and Breeding Centre, Pinjore
 Pheasant Breeding Centre Morni
 Pheasant Breeding Centre, Berwala
 Peacock & Chinkara Breeding Centre, Jhabua in Rewari district
 Deer Park, Hisar
 Wetlands
 Dighal Wetlands, an Important Bird Area
 Basai Wetland
 Blue Bird Lake

Hierarchy of settlements of Haryana 
 State (Haryana)
 Divisions (comprising one or more districts)
 Districts (comprising cities, towns and villages)
 Cities and Towns (run by Municipal committee/corporation under Urban Development ministry)
 Wards (city is subdivided in to several wards)
 Colonies (each ward has one or more colonies/neighbourhood)
 Tehsils (Department of Revenue) and Block (Department of Rural Development, area usually overlaps with tehsil)
 Gram panchayat
 Village (each panchayat has one or more village)
 Pana (subdivisions within village are called pana or ward) 
 Dhani (some villages also have scattered isolated dhanis within its official geographical limits)

Regions of Haryana

Administrative Units of Haryana 
 Divisions of Haryana
 Ambala division
 Gurgaon division
 Hisar division
 Rohtak division
 Karnal division
 Faridabad division
 Districts of Haryana
 Ambala district
 Bhiwani district
 Faridabad district
 Fatehabad district
 Gurgaon district
 Hisar district
 Jhajjar district
 Jind district
 Kaithal district
 Karnal district
 Kurukshetra district
 Mahendragarh district
 Mewat District
 Panchkula district
 Palwal district
 Panipat district
 Rewari district
 Rohtak district
 Sirsa district
 Sonipat district
 Yamuna Nagar district
 Charkhi Dadri district
 Tehsils of Haryana
 Municipalities of Haryana
 List of cities in Haryana by population

Miscellaneous regions of Haryana 
 Ahirwal
 Bagar region
 Bhattiana, part of bagar region
 Deswali region, region of Haryana where Deswali dialect of Haryanvi language is spoken 
 Khadir and Bangar
 Mewat
 Nardak
 South Haryana

Government and Politics of Haryana 

 Form of government: State Government of India
 Capital of Haryana: Chandigarh, is also the capital of the state of Punjab, and is a Union territory, separate from the two states.

Elections in Haryana 
 Elections to the Haryana Legislative Assembly
 List of constituencies of the Haryana Legislative Assembly
 1982 Haryana Legislative Assembly election
 1987 Haryana Legislative Assembly election
 1991 Haryana Legislative Assembly election
 2000 Haryana Legislative Assembly election
 2005 Haryana Legislative Assembly election
 2009 Haryana Legislative Assembly election
 2014 Haryana Legislative Assembly election
 2019 Haryana Legislative Assembly election
 Elections to the Lok Sabha in Haryana
 List of constituencies of the Lok Sabha in Haryana
 Indian general election in Haryana, 1991
 Indian general election in Haryana, 1996
 Indian general election in Haryana, 1998
 Indian general election in Haryana, 1999
 Indian general election in Haryana, 2004
 Indian general election in Haryana, 2009
 Indian general election in Haryana, 2014
 Indian general election in Haryana, 2019
 Political parties in Haryana
 Bharatiya Janata Party (BJP)
 Indian National Congress (INC)
 Indian National Lok Dal (INLD)
 Jannayak Janta Party (JJP)
 Political families of Haryana

Branches of the Government of Haryana 
 Executive branch of Haryana Government
 Governor of Haryana
 List of Governors of Haryana
 Raj Bhavan (Haryana)
 Council of Ministers headed by the Chief Minister of Haryana
 List of Chief Ministers of Haryana
 Secretariat Building (Chandigarh)
 Haryana Government Departments
 Department of Economic and Statistical Analysis, Haryana
 Department of Elementary Education, Haryana
 Department of Environment, Haryana
 Department of Excise & Taxation, Haryana
 Department of Higher Education, Haryana
 Department of Industrial Training & Vocational Education, Haryana
 Department of Industries & Commerce, Haryana
 Department of Institutional Finance & Credit Control, Haryana 
 Department of Labour & Employment, Haryana
 Department of Land records & Consolidation, Haryana 
 Department of Rehabilitation, Haryana
 Department of Revenue and Disaster Management, Haryana
 Department of School Education, Haryana
 State Agencies of Haryana
 Dakshin Haryana Bijli Vitran Nigam
 Debt Conciliation Board
 Director Secondary Education, Haryana
 Haryana State Directorate of Archaeology & Museums
 Haryana Waqf Board
 Foreign Investment and NRI Cell, Government of Haryana
 Haryana Civil Medical Services
 Haryana Environment Protection Council
 Haryana Land Record Information System
 Haryana Power Generation Corporation
 Haryana Roadways
 Haryana Seeds Development Corporation
 Haryana State Legal Services Authority, Haryana
 Haryana Tourism Corporation Limited
 Haryana Urban Development Authority
 State Counselling Board, Haryana
 Uttar Haryana Bijli Vitran Nigam
 Legislative branch of Haryana Government
 Legislature type: Unicameral consisting of the Haryana Legislative Assembly
 Palace of Assembly (Chandigarh)
 Judiciary of Haryana
 Punjab and Haryana High Court
 List of former Chief Justices of Punjab and Haryana High Court
 Palace of Justice (Chandigarh)

Law and order in Haryana 
 Haryana Police

History of Haryana

History of Haryana, by period 
 Indus Valley Civilization
 Balu, Haryana
 Banawali
 Bhirrana
 Farmana
 Jognakhera
 Kunal
 Lohari Ragho
 Mitathal
 Rakhigarhi
 Siswal

Culture of Haryana 

 Festivals of Haryana external link
 Public holidays in Haryana external link

Art in Haryana

Literary Arts of Haryana 
 Literature of Haryana

Performing arts of Haryana

Cinema of Haryana 
 List of Haryanvi-language films

Theatre in Haryana 
 Saang
 Ras Leela
 Ragini

Dance and Music 
 Folk Dances of Haryana 
 Music of Haryana 
 Devotional
 Chaupaiya (on verses)
 Holi festival
 Manjira (type of Cymbal)
 Ras Leela (of Krishna and Gopis)
 Ragini
 Festive seasonal 
 Gogaji and Gugga
 Holi
 Phaag, 
 Sawan
 Teej
 Ceremonial and recreational
 Legendary bravery 
 Kissa 
 Ragini
 Love and romance 
 Been (including its variant Nāginī dance) 
 Ragini
 Ceremonial 
 Dhamal Dance,
 Ghoomar 
 Jhoomar (sway, male only)
 Khoria dance 
 Loor dance 
 Ragini

Visual arts of Haryana

Architecture of Haryana 

 Forts of Haryana
 List of State Protected Monuments in Haryana
 List of Monuments of National Importance in Haryana
 UNESCO World Heritage Sites in Haryana: Chandigarh Capitol Complex, as part of the Architectural Work of Le Corbusier
 Open Hand Monument
 Rock Garden of Chandigarh

Embroidery of Haryana 

 Phulkari, which has been awarded the Geographical indication (GI) status in the Indian states of Punjab, Haryana and Rajasthan
 Shisha (embroidery)

Clothing and ornaments in Haryana

Men 

Kurta
 Pajamas
 Dhoti
 Khandwa

Women 
 Gagra choli (Lehenga and Choli)
 Shalwar kameez
 Dupatta, which sometimes used as a Ghoonghat

Cuisine of Haryana 
 North Indian cuisine
 Punjabi cuisine
 Haryanvi cuisine
 Dishes of Haryana

Languages and dialects of Haryana 

 Hindi (Central Zone)
 Haryanvi language 
 Deswali (dialect) (also called Deshwali, Desari and Desaru, spoken in Deswal region covering districts of Rohtak, Sonipat, Jhajjar, Delhi and north west Gurgaon.
 Standard Haryanvi (dialect) spoken in Jind, Hisar, Hansi, Bhiwani, Tosham, Charki Dadri, Meham and Gohana.
 Jatu (dialect)(dialect of the Jats) sub-dialect of deswali, spoken by Jats and Rors in low-lying khadir flood planes on western banks of Yamuna in Panipat, Karnal,Kuruksehtra and Yamunanagar districts.
 Bangru (dialect) (also called Banagaru, Hariani & Haryiani, spoken in areas between Khadar region, Bagar region and deswali region in Kaithal District, Pehowa, Tohana, Barwala, Narwana and Assandh.
 Bagri dialect spoken in (Bagar region of sandy western Haryana covering Sirsa, Ellenabad, Fatehabad, Adampur, Balsamand, Siwani and Bahal in Haryana.
 Sansi dialect (distinct language of Sansi nomads, with influence of Rajasthani, Punjabi, Haryanvi and Hindi languages)
 Mewati language is spoken in Nuh District, Sohna and part of Palwal District.
 Ahirwati dialect is spoken in Rewari, Mahendragarh, Narnaul, Loharu, Matanheil and parts of Gurugram District like Pataudi and Manesar.
 (Rangri dialect is another type for Haryanvi language used by haryanvi-Muslim migrants living in Pakistan)
 Braj Bhasha (Faridabad and Palwal districts)
 Pahari languages (in hill areas of Ambala, Panchkula and Yamuna Nagar districts)
 Puadhi dialect is spoken in districts of Panchkula District, Ambala District and parts of Kuruksehtra District like Shahbad Markanda.
 Rathi dialect is spoken in central Sirsa District and northern Fatehabad district..
 Punjabi languages
 Malwai dialect is spoken in northern Sirsa District which includes Mandi Dabwali, Kalanwali and Odhan. It also spoken in Ratia Tehsil of Fatehbad District.

Media in Haryana 
 TV Channels focused on Haryanavi
 DD Haryana
 Newspapers in Haryana
 Amar Ujala
 Dainik Jagran
 Hari Bhoomi
 Punjab Kesari

Museums in Haryana 
 Hisar
 Haryana Rural Antique Museum
 Jahaj Kothi Museum
 Rakhigarhi Indus Valley Civilisation Museum
 Kurukshetra 
 Dharohar Museum
 Shrikrishna Museum
 Kurukshetra Panorama and Science Centre

People of Haryana 
 List of people from Haryana

Caste/community breakdown:
 Jat, 25% to 28% Single largest ethnic group of 
 Brahmin, 20% to 22% Second largest ethnic group of Haryana.Historically socio-economically dominant.
 OBC, 24%, Includes Ahir, Saini, Yadava, etc. Excluding Jats who have been demanding OBC status for jobs. 
 Scheduled Castes, 21%, Dalits, from marginalised communities such as Balmiki, Chamar, Dhanak and Khatik.
 Other non-dalit non-SC castes, 7% to 10, Includes mainly Baniya and Punjabi people (excluding Jat Sikh, Punjabi speaking 1947 partition migrants who are now natives of Haryana) and the rest.

Religion in Haryana 
Population data as per Census of India 2011:
 Hinduism in Haryana, 87.46%
 Hindu Temples in Haryana
 Sikhism in Haryana, 04.91%
 Gurdwara Toka Sahib
 Kapal Mochan
 Nada Sahib
 Gurudwara Sheeshganj Sahib
 Islam in Haryana, 07.03%
 Kabuli Bagh Mosque
 Christianity in Haryana, 0.20%
 Cantonment Church Tower
 Immaculate Heart Church, (Karnal)
 Seventh-day Adventist Church, Nilokheri
 St. Thomas Church, Hisar
 The United Church, Nilokheri
 Jainism in Haryana, 0.21%
 Buddhism in Haryana, 0.03%
 Adi Badri stupa
 Agroha Mound
 Assandh Stupa
 Fatehabad Ashokan Pillar
 Hisar Ashokan Pillar
 Thaneshwar Stupa
 Topra Kalan Ahokan Edicts Park
 Srughna (Sugh in Yamuna Nagaer)
 Others, 0.01%
 Not stated, 0.17%
 Punjabi folk religion
 Naugaja Peer

Sports in Haryana 
 Governing Bodies for Sports in Haryana:
 Haryana Archery Association
 Haryana Cricket Association
 Sports' Clubs and Academies in Haryana:
 Bhiwani Boxing Club
 Chandigarh Golf Club
 DLF Golf and Country Club
 State Teams of Haryana:
 Haryana cricket team
 Haryana football team
 Sports venues in Haryana:
 Stadiums in Haryana

State Symbols of Haryana 
 State animal: Blackbuck
 State Bird: Black francolin
 State Flower: Lotus
 State Tree: Peepal
 State seal: Seal of Haryana

Economy and infrastructure of Haryana 

Economy of Haryana

Agriculture and Allied Sectors in Haryana 
 Green Revolution in Haryana
 Livestock Breeds in Haryana
 Haryanvi cattle, Mewati cattle, and Sahiwal cattle, all of which are breeds of Zebu
 Murrah buffalo
 Nali Sheep, Muzzafarnagri (Sheep) and Hissardale (Sheep)
 ICAR-affiliated Institutions, Universities, National Bureaus and Research Centres in Haryana
 Central Institute for Research on Buffaloes (CIRB), Hisar
 Central Sheep Breeding Farm, Hisar
 Chaudhary Charan Singh Haryana Agricultural University, Hisar
 List of agricultural centres established by CCS HAU
 Government Livestock Farm, Hisar
 ICAR CIFE Rohtak centre
 Indian Institute of Wheat and Barley Research, Karnal
 Lala Lajpat Rai University of Veterinary & Animal Sciences, Hisar
 National Bureau of Animal Genetic Resources, Karnal
 National Dairy Research Institute, Karnal
 Northern Region Farm Machinery Training and Testing Institute
 National Research Centre on Equines, Hisar
 Regional Fodder Station, Hisar

Irrigation
 Dams
 Bhakra Dam
 Lakhwar Dam on Yamuna (including downstream Yvasi Dam and Katapathar Barrage), under-construction
 Renuka Dam on Yamuna, under-construction
 Kishau Dam on Tons River, proposed
 Rivers
 Yamuna and its tributaries including Sahibi River (and tributaries)
 Ghagghar-Hakra river
 Canals
 Western Yamuna Canal
 Rajasthan Canal

Industry Sector in Haryana 
 Manufacturing
 Automotive industry in Haryana
 National Fertilizers Limited plant at Panipat
 Indian Oil Corporation's Panipat Refinery
 Economic and Industrial Corridors, and Investment Regions
 Special Economic Zones in Haryana
 Amritsar Delhi Kolkata Industrial Corridor
 Delhi Mumbai Industrial Corridor Project Haryana nodes

Services Sector in Haryana 
 Banking in Haryana
 State Bank of Patiala, an associate bank of the State Bank Group
 Oriental Bank of Commerce
 Sarva Haryana Gramin Bank, a Regional Rural Bank
 Haryana State Cooperative Apex Bank Ltd.
 Tourism in Haryana

Transportation in Haryana 
 Road network in Haryana
 Ancient Routes passing through Haryana
 Delhi Multan Road
 Grand Trunk Road
 Expressways passing through Haryana
 Ambala Chandigarh Expressway
 Delhi Faridabad Skyway
 Delhi Gurgaon Expressway
 Eastern Peripheral Expressway
 Faridabad-Noida-Ghaziabad Expressway
 Himalayan Expressway
 Western Peripheral Expressway
 Panipat Elevated Expressway
 Pathankot Ajmer Expressway
 National Highways passing through Haryana
 North-south oriented highways (with even numbers increasing from the east to the west): NH 44 (NH 344), NH 48, NH 52 (NH 152, NH 352)
 East-west oriented highways (with odd numbers increasing from the north to the south): NH 5 (NH 105), NH 7 (NH 907), NH 9 (NH 709), NH 19 (NH 919)
 Parts of Golden Quadrilateral in Haryana
 State Highways in Haryana
 List of state highways in Haryana
 Railway network in Haryana
 Freight corridors
 Eastern Dedicated Freight Corridor
 Western Dedicated Freight Corridor
 High-speed rail network
 Diamond Quadrilateral 
 Zonation of Indian Railways with respect to Haryana
 Northern Railway zone
 Ambala railway division
 Kalka–Shimla Railway, a UNESCO World Heritage Site along with the other Mountain railways of India
 Delhi railway division
 North Central Railway zone
 North Western Railway zone
 Bikaner railway division
 Railway Stations in Haryana
 Aviation in Haryana
 Airports in Haryana
 Civil airports in Haryana
 Bhiwani Airport
 Hisar Airport
 Karnal Airport
 Narnaul Airport
 Pinjore Airport, also called Kalka Airport
 Military airports in Haryana
 Ambala Air Force Station
 Sirsa Air Force Station
 Military and Civil Airports in Haryana
 Chandigarh Airport, a restricted international airport
 Pilot Training Institutes in Haryana
 Haryana Institute of Civil Aviation

Energy in Haryana 
 Electricity sector in Haryana
 Status of Rural electrification: 100%
 List of power stations in Haryana
 Coal-based power stations in Haryana
 Deenbandhu Chhotu Ram Thermal Power Station, Yamunanagar
 Faridabad Thermal Power Station
 Indira Gandhi Super Thermal Power Project, Jhajjar
 Mahatma Gandhi Super Thermal Power Project, Jhajjar
 Panipat Thermal Power Station I
 Panipat Thermal Power Station II
 Rajiv Gandhi Thermal Power Station, Hisar
 Natural gas-based power stations in Haryana
 Faridabad Thermal Power Plant
 Diesel-based power stations in Haryana
 Ambala Diesel Power Station
 Nuclear power stations
 Gorakhpur Nuclear Power Plant, Fatehabad
 Solar power stations in Haryana
 Faridabad Solar PV Power Plant
 IIT Bombay - Gwal Pahari, Haryana 
 Energy-related research and training Institutes in Haryana:
 National Power Training Institute
 National Institute of Solar Energy, Gurgaon
 International Solar Alliance Headquarters, Gurgaon

Education in Haryana 
 Haryana Board of School Education
 Director Secondary Education, Haryana
 Central University of Haryana
 Chaudhary Charan Singh Haryana Agricultural University
 List of institutions of higher education in Haryana
 Haryana Institute of Technology (HIT)
 Haryana Technical Institute
 ITM University, Gurgaon, Haryana

Heath and safety in Haryana 
 Herbal Parks
 Ch. Devi Lal Herbal Nature Park
 Ch. Surender Singh Memorial Herbal Park, Kairu
 Ch. Surender Singh Memorial Herbal Park, Tosham
 Shatavar Vatika Herbal Park, Hisar

See also 
 Outline of India

 Haryana Colony
 Haryana Gana Parishad
 Haryana Sikh Gurdwara Parbandhak Committee
 Haryana State Akali Dal
 Haryana Vikas Party
 Kharkhoda (Haryana)
 Nirmal Singh (Haryana)
 Pur (Bhiwani, Haryana)
 Vishal Haryana Party

 Archaeological
 Agroha Mound

 Historical
 Bhima Devi Temple Complex at Pinjore
 Farrukhnagar
 Mughal Bridge at Kernal
 Harsh ka Tilla at Kurukshetra
 Nahar Singh Mahal
 Narnaul 
 Pataudi Palace
 Pinjore Gardens
 Sthaneshwar Mahadev Temple 
 Surajkund
 Tomb of Saikh Taiyab at Kaithal 
 Tosham rock inscription

 Zoos in Haryana 
 Hisar Deer Park
 Rohtak Zoo
 Pipli Zoo

 Dams in Haryana
 Anagpur Dam
 Hathnikund Barrage
 Ottu barrage
 Tajewala Barrage

 Public places
 Courtyard by Marriott
 Kingdom of Dreams
 Mall of India
 The Oberoi

References

External links 

 Government of Haryana official website

Haryana
Haryana
Haryana
Haryana-related lists
 
 
 
Rivers of India